Harry Stocker (1840 – 22 April 1923)  was Archdeacon of Southland from 1885 until he retired in 1913.

Stocker was born in Boughton under Blean, educated at Trinity College, Dublin and ordained deacon in 1868 and priest in 1869. After a curacy in Kingsclere, he came to New Zealand in 1873. He held incumbencies at Springston, Akaroa and St John, Invercargill.

He retired to Merivale, died on 22 April 1923 and is buried in the St Paul's cemetery at Papanui.

References

Archdeacons of Southland
Alumni of Trinity College Dublin
1860 births
People from Boughton under Blean
1947 deaths
Burials at St Paul's Cemetery, Christchurch
People from Christchurch